Below are the results for the 2017 World Series of Poker Europe, held from October 19-November 10 at King's Casino in Rozvadov, Czech Republic.

Key

Results
Source:

Event 1: €1,100 No Limit Hold'em Monster Stack
5-Day Event: October 19-23
Number of buy-ins: 561
Total Prize Pool: €538,280
Number of Payouts: 84
Winning Hand:

Event 2: €550 Pot Limit Omaha
3-Day Event: October 23-25
Number of buy-ins: 523
Total Prize Pool: €250,909
Number of Payouts: 31
Winning Hand:

Event 3: €1,100 No Limit Hold'em Super Turbo Bounty
1-Day Event: October 25
Number of buy-ins: 325
Total Prize Pool: €214,337
Number of Payouts: 49
Winning Hand:

Event 4: €1,650 No Limit Hold'em Six-Handed
3-Day Event: October 26-28
Number of buy-ins: 240
Total Prize Pool: €345,420
Number of Payouts: 36
Winning Hand:

Event 5: €550 The Colossus No Limit Hold'em
7-Day Event: October 27-November 2
Number of buy-ins: 4,115
Total Prize Pool: €2,078,075
Number of Payouts: 258
Winning Hand:

Event 6: €2,200 Pot Limit Omaha
3-Day Event: October 28-30
Number of buy-ins: 191
Total Prize Pool: €366,529
Number of Payouts: 
Winning Hand:

Event 7: €1,650 Pot Limit Omaha Hi-Lo 8 or Better
2-Day Event: October 31-November 1
Number of buy-ins: 92
Total Prize Pool: €132,411
Number of Payouts: 14
Winning Hand:

Event 8: €1,111 Little One for One Drop No Limit Hold'em
4-Day Event: November 1-4
Number of buy-ins: 868
Total Prize Pool: €866,654
Number of Payouts: 131
Winning Hand:

Event 9: €25,000 No Limit Hold'em High Roller
2-Day Event: November 1-2
Number of buy-ins: 113 
Total Prize Pool: €2,673,545
Number of Payouts: 17
Winning Hand:

Event 10: €111,111 High Roller for One Drop No Limit Hold'em
3-Day Event: November 3-5
Number of buy-ins: 132
Total Prize Pool: €12,980,000
Number of Payouts: 20
Winning Hand:

Event 11: €10,350 No Limit Hold'em Main Event
7-Day Event: November 4-10
Number of buy-ins: 529
Total Prize Pool: €5,025,500
Number of Payouts: 80
Winning Hand:

References

External links
Official website

World Series of Poker Europe
World Series of Poker Europe Results, 2017